Das Steingeschöpf is a short fiction written by G. V. Anderson.  It was her first professional short story  and won the World Fantasy Award for Best Short Fiction in 2017.  G. V. Anderson  was born in  1990  and  lives in Dorset,  the south coast of England.

Plot summary 
The story is about Hertzel,  a young stone restorationist, who just finished his apprenticeship and received his first job assignment from Frau Leitner, a German lady, to repair a stone statue.

He made the journey from Berlin to Bavaria by train and arrived Frau Leitner’s chalet very late at night. He found out that she was an older woman with a bad cough.  He anxiously asked Frau Leitner to show him the Steingeschöpf that needed restoration and they went upstairs to the attic. Hertzel was astonished when he discovered that stone creature named "Ambroise"  was carved in Queckstein by De Loynes, the Great French Master in the 17th century.  He suddenly felt inadequate and was afraid he was not up to the task.  There was also danger in  working with the Queckstein as its dust could destroy the lungs. He tried to refuse the job but Frau Leitner talked him into it.

The story also shows the affection between Ambroise and Frau Leitner, and how little time they had left.

References

External links
Text of the story at “Strange Horizons”. Issued 12 Dec 2016
 “Das Steingeschöpf”, reviewed by Sara L. Uckelman. May 4, 2018

British fantasy novels
World Fantasy Award-winning works
2016 short stories